An email loop is an infinite loop phenomenon, resulting from mail servers, scripts, or email clients that generate automatic replies or responses. If one such automatic response triggers another automatic response on the other side, an email loop is created. The process can continue until one mailbox is full or reaches its mail sending limit. In theory, the email loop could last indefinitely. Email loops may be caused accidentally or maliciously, causing denial of service. Although rare, email loops involving more than two participants can also occur.

Email loops are not as common today as in the past, due to changes to email software, both on the client side and the server side, that prevent automatic replies to vacation responses and bounced mail responses.

Costs of an email loop 
 Bandwidth: Email loops use up limited bandwidth over networks.
 Processing time: Email loops will take up processing time, and could slow down other processes.
 Disk space: Automatic emails are usually stored in the mailboxes of participants.
 Human time: Network administrators may have to intervene to fix the problem, or clean up mailboxes. Also the mailbox user/owner will have to delete the numerous responses in order to clean up the mailbox.
 Reputation damage: If an internet loop involves a large number of people, it can result in reputational damage for the organization. Recipients of the loop may perceive it as spam, which can damage the sender's reputation and result in future emails being filtered to spam folders.
 Security risks: An internet loop can also pose a security risk if it involves sensitive information. For example, if an email containing confidential information is caught in a loop, it can be sent to unintended recipients, resulting in a data breach.
 Legal liabilities: In some cases, an internet loop can result in legal liabilities. For instance, if an email containing defamatory or discriminatory language is caught in a loop, it can result in a lawsuit.
 Productivity loss: An internet loop can cause significant productivity loss for both individuals and organizations. For example, if an employee's mailbox is inundated with looped emails, it can take a significant amount of time to delete them, resulting in lost productivity.
 Resource consumption: An internet loop can consume a significant amount of resources, including bandwidth, processing time, and disk space. This can result in slower network speeds, decreased system performance, and increased storage costs.

Causes 
 Autoresponders, such as automatic "on vacation" replies
 Email bounces due to, for example, exceeding the inbox disk quota
 Replies to indicate that that mail has been delivered
 Replies to email read-receipts
 Misconfigured email servers that try to deliver messages to systems that pass the message along to another host, with a loop leading in a circle.  (Modern mail systems will detect mail forwarded back and forth between two hosts, but a routing loop involving three hosts is much harder to detect.)

Prevention 
 The mail system should retain headers of incoming email while performing any type of auto-forwarding operation.
 Auto Responder: Do not send more than 'x' replies to the same sender.
 Headers hinting at auto-responders, like X-Auto-Response-Suppress: All (Microsoft Exchange)  or Auto-Submitted: auto-generated (RFC 3834)

References

External links 
Vacation E-Mail Loop
The Free Dictionary
What does the "too many hops" error mean when an email message I send fails?

Email